Yussef Suleiman (also transcribed as Sleman; 17 September 1986 – 20 February 2013) was a Syrian football player.

Suleiman was born in Homs and last played for Al-Wathba SC. He was killed by a mortar shell fired by the armed opposition during the Syrian civil war, while preparing for training practice inside a hotel in Baramkeh, Damascus. The attack occurred a few hours before the team was to play a league game against the Hama-based Nawair club at Tishreen Stadium in Damascus.

His teammates reported that he was the father of a six-month-old baby. FIFA president Sepp Blatter expressed his condolences in an open letter to the Syrian Football Association over the matter.

He played for Al Karamah in the 2008 AFC Champions League knockout stages.

Notes
According to some sources Suleiman was 19 years old at the time of his death.

References

1986 births
2013 deaths
Syrian footballers
Al-Karamah players
Association football forwards
Sportspeople from Homs
Deaths by explosive device
People killed in the Syrian civil war
Syrian Premier League players